Rajat Kapoor (born 11 February 1961) is an Indian actor, filmmaker and playwright who works in Hindi cinema. Kapoor was born in Delhi, India. He mainly focused on acting at first. In 2013 he joined the theatre group Chingari in Delhi, later moving to Pune to attend the Film and Television Institute of India (FTII).

Career
Kapoor started out in Parallel Cinema making his debut in the 1989 Kumar Shahani film Khayal Gatha. When he had trouble finding acting jobs in the 1990s, Kapoor began writing and directing shorts. He made his full-length directorial debut with Private Detective: Two Plus Two Plus One (1997), which had Irrfan Khan and Naseeruddin Shah in minor roles. In 2001, Kapoor got his big mainstream break-in Dil Chahta Hai, which starred Aamir Khan, as Preity Zinta's character's uncle. He received international attention in Mira Nair's Monsoon Wedding in which he played an abusive uncle. Since then, he has written, directed, and appeared in many films including Corporate, Bheja Fry, and also as Muhammad Ali Jinnah in a UK television film The Last Days of the Raj in 2007. In 2003, he wrote and directed the independent film Raghu Romeo which he financed by sending e-mail requests for money to his friends. Although it was not a box office success, the film won the National Film Award for Best Feature Film in Hindi. Kapoor then directed and starred in Mixed Doubles, a film that deals with Swinging in contemporary Mumbai. In 2008 he directed a Sleeper hit called Mithya. He was also nominated for Best Performance by an Actor for Siddharth: The Prisoner at the 2008 Asia Pacific Screen Awards. In the year 2010, he has also starred in a Bengali movie Iti Mrinalini opposite Konkona Sen directed by Bengali film writer Aparna Sen. Kapoor frequently collaborates with actors Vinay Pathak and Ranvir Shorey.

Apart from films, Kapoor hosts the tri-weekly chat show Lounge telecasted by NDTV Good Times. He also worked in television shows, including Rishtey which was aired on Zee TV in the episode 'Milan'. Tired of pitching his stories to investors, Kapoor reached out to his friend Chet Jainn, founder of the crowdfunding platform goCrowdera.com to raise initial seed fund for his next film called "RkRkay". The "RkRkay" crowdfunding campaign went on to raise over ₹35,00,000.

In October 2018, Kapoor was accused of sexual harassment by two women during the Me Too movement, following which he apologised. His film Kadakh was dropped from the 20th MAMI Film Festival due to the allegations. 

He has worked in Scam 1992 as an investigating officer.

Personal life
Kapoor married Meenal Agarwal, a photographer-production designer in 1996 and has two children, a daughter Rabia and a son Vivan.

Awards and recognition 
Kapoor is a three time National Award winner, first for his 26-minute non-feature documentary, Tarana, then for his short, Hypnothesis, and after that for Raghu Romeo in Best Feature Film in Hindi section.

Filmography

Film

Television

References

External links

 

1961 births
Living people
Filmfare Awards winners
Male actors from Delhi
20th-century Indian film directors
Film and Television Institute of India alumni
Indian atheists
Punjabi people
21st-century Indian film directors
20th-century Indian male actors
Film directors from Delhi
Screenwriters from Delhi
Film producers from Delhi
Hindi screenwriters
Hindi-language film directors
21st-century Indian male actors